Tokoyo may refer to:
A realm in Japanese mythology sometimes identified with Mount Penglai in Chinese mythology
Tokoyo (fictional character), the protagonist of a folk tale

See also:
Tokyo, the capital of Japan